The AMS Distinguished Public Service Award, awarded every 2 years by the American Mathematical Society, recognizes a research mathematician who has made a distinguished contribution to the mathematics profession during the preceding five years. It was first awarded in 1990.

Recipients 
The recipients of the AMS Distinguished Public Service Award are:

 1990: Kenneth M. Hoffman
 1991: No award
 1992: Harvey B. Keynes
 1993: I. M. Singer  
 1995: Donald J. Lewis
 1997: No award made
 1998: Kenneth C. Millett
 2000: Paul J. Sally, Jr.
 2002: Margaret H. Wright
 2004: Richard A. Tapia
 2006: Roger Howe
 2008: Herbert Clemens
 2010: Carlos Castillo-Chavez
 2012: William McCallum
 2014: Philip Kutzko
 2016: Aloysius Helminck
 2018: Sylvain Cappell

See also

 List of mathematics awards

References 

Awards of the American Mathematical Society